Sam Kelly (1943-2014) was a British actor from Allo 'Allo! and On The Up.

Sam Kelly is the name of:
 Sam Kelly (musician), British singer on Britain's Got Talent
 Samantha Kelly (born 1997), Northern Irish footballer
 Samantha Kelly (character), character from The Bold and the Beautiful
 Sam Kelly (footballer) (born 1993), English professional footballer

See also
Sam Kelley (born 1946), professor at the State University of New York College at Cortland